The Marsh Arabs ( ʻArab al-Ahwār "Arabs of the Marshlands"), also referred to as the Maʻdān ( "dweller in the plains") or Shroog (Mesopotamian Arabic شروگ), "those from the east")—the latter two often considered derogatory in the present day—are Arabian inhabitants of the Mesopotamian marshlands in the modern-day south Iraq, as well as in the Hawizeh Marshes straddling the Iraq-Iran border.

Comprising members of many different tribes and tribal confederations, such as the Āl Bū Muḥammad, Ferayghāt, Shaghanbah, the Maʻdān had developed a culture centered on the marshes' natural resources and unique from other Arabs. Many of the marshes' inhabitants were displaced when the wetlands were drained during and after the 1991 uprisings in Iraq. The draining of the marshes caused a significant decline in bioproductivity; following the Multi-National Force overthrow of the Saddam Hussein regime, water flow to the marshes was restored and the ecosystem has begun to recover.

Culture
The term Maʻdān was used disparagingly by desert tribes to refer to those inhabiting the Iraqi river basins, as well as by those who farmed in the river basins to refer to the population of the marshes.

The Maʻdān speak South Mesopotamian Arabic and traditionally wore a variant of normal Arab dress: for males, a thawb ("long shirt"; in recent times, occasionally with a Western-style jacket over the top) and a keffiyeh ("headcloth") worn twisted around the head in a turban, as few could afford an ʻiqāl.

Agriculture
The society of the Marsh Arabs was divided into two main groups by occupation. One group bred and raised water buffaloes while others cultivated crops such as rice, barley, wheat and pearl millet; they also kept some sheep and cattle. Rice cultivation was especially important; it was carried out in small plots cleared in April and sown in mid-May. Cultivation seasons were marked by the rising and setting of certain stars, such as the Pleiades and Sirius.

Some branches of the Maʻdān were nomadic pastoralists, erecting temporary dwellings and moving buffaloes around the marshes according to the season. Some fishing, especially of species of barbel (notably the binni or bunni, Mesopotamichthys sharpeyi), was practised using spears and datura poison, but large-scale fishing using nets was until recent times regarded as a dishonourable profession by the Maʻdān and was mostly carried out by a separate low-status tribe known as the Berbera. By the early 1990s, however, up to 60% of the total amount of fish caught in Iraq's inland waters came from the marshes.

In the later twentieth century, a third main occupation entered Marsh Arab life; the weaving of reed mats on a commercial scale. Though they often earned far more than workers in agriculture, weavers were looked down upon by both Maʻdān and farmers alike: however, financial concerns meant that it gradually gained acceptance as a respectable profession.

Religion
The majority of Marsh Arabs are Twelver Shiʿi Muslims, though in the marshes small communities of Mandaic-speaking Mandaeans (often working as boat builders and craftsmen) live alongside them. The inhabitants' long association with tribes within Persia may have influenced the spread of the Shī‘ī denomination within the marshes. Wilfred Thesiger commented that while he met few Marsh Arabs who had performed the Hajj, many of them had made the pilgrimage to Mashhad (thereby earning the title Zair); a number of families also claimed descent from Muhammad, adopting the title of sayyid and dyeing their keffiyeh green.The Maʻdān carried out the majority of their devotions in private as there were no places of worship within the Marshes; some were known to visit Ezra's Tomb, one of the few religious sites of any kind in the area.

Society
As with most tribes of southern Iraq, the main authority was the tribal shaikh. To this day, the shaikh of a Marsh Arab group will collect a tribute from his tribe in order to maintain the mudhif, the tribal guesthouse, which acts as the political, social, judicial and religious centre of Marsh Arabic life. The mudhif is used as a place to settle disputes, to carry out diplomacy with other tribes and as a gathering point for religious and other celebrations. It is also the place where visitors are offered hospitality. Although the tribal shaykh was the principal figure, each Maʻdān village (which may have contained members of several different tribes) would also follow the authority of the hereditary qalit "headman" of a tribe's particular section.

Blood feuds, which could only be settled by the qalit, were a feature of Marsh Arab life, in common with that of the Arab bedouin. Many of the Marsh Arabs' codes of behaviour were similar to those of the desert tribes.

Most Marsh Arabs lived in arched reed houses considerably smaller than a mudhif. The typical dwelling was usually a little more than two meters wide, about six meters long, and a little less than three meters high, and was either constructed at the waterside or on an artificial island of reeds called a kibasha; a more permanent island of layered reeds and mud was called a dibin. Houses had entrances at both ends and a screen in the middle; one end was used as a dwelling and the other end (sometimes extended with a sitra, a long reed structure) was used to shelter animals in bad weather. A raba was a higher-status dwelling, distinguished by a north-facing entrance, which also served as a guesthouse where there was no mudhif. Traditional boats (the mashoof and tarada) were used as transport: the Maʻdān would drive buffalo through the reedbeds during the season of low water to create channels, which would then be kept open by constant use, for the boats.
The marsh environment meant that certain diseases, such as schistosomiasis and malaria, were endemic; Maʻdānī agriculture and homes were also vulnerable to periodic droughts and flooding.

Origin theories
The origins of the Maʻdān are still a matter of some interest. British colonial ethnographers found it difficult to classify some of the Maʻdān's social customs and speculated that they might have originated in India. It is also suggested that some of the segments of Marsh Arabs may have been originally Zutt, who moved to the region of lower Iraq in the 8th and 9th centuries.

There are scholars who have claimed they are descended from the Nabataeans of Iraq the people who inhabited southern Iraq during the medieval and even some of their clans follow their ancestry to the Islamized Mandaeans. 

Other scholars have proposed historical and genetic links between the Marsh Arabs and the ancient Sumerians due shared agricultural practices, methods of house-building and location. There is, however, no written record of the marsh tribes until the 9th century, and the Sumerians lost their distinct ethnic identity by around 1800 BCE, some 2700 years before. Links to Sumerian genetics can likely be traced back to the Arabization and assimilation of indigenous Mesopotamians. Others, however, have noted that much of the culture of the Maʻdān is in fact shared with the desert bedouin who came to the area after the fall of the Abbasid Caliphate.

Genetics

A 2011 study showed that Marsh Arabs have a high concentration of Y-chromosomal Haplogroup J-M267 and mtDNA haplogroup J having the highest concentration, with haplogroups H, U and T following, the study included 143 samples from a tribe related to the Bedouin tribes of desert and not the regular marsh tribes. According to this study, Marsh Arabs have the following haplogroups.
 Y-DNA haplogroups:
 E1b1b 6.3% (-M35* 2.1%, -M78* 0.7%, -M123* 1.4%, -M34 2.1%)
 G-M201 1.4%
 J1 81.1% (-M267* 7.0%, -P58 (Page08)* 72.7%, -M365 (shared with other J1 branches) 1.4%), J2-M172* 3.5%
 L-M76 0.7%
 Q-M242 2.8% (Q1a1b-M25 0.7%, Q1b-M378 2.1%)
 R-M207 4.2% (R1-L23 2.8%, R2-M124 1.4%)
 Mt-DNA haplogroups:
 West Eurasia (77.8%): R0 24.1% (R0* 0.7%, R0a 6.9%, HV 4.1%, H 12.4%), KU 15.9% (K 6.2%, U 9.7%), JT 22.7% (J 15.2%, T 7.6%), N 15.1% (I 0.7%, N1 8.2%, W 4.8%, X2 1.4%)
 North/East Africa (2.8%): M1 2.8%
 Sub-Saharan Africa (4.9%): L 4.9%
 East Asia (1.4%): B4c2 1.4%
 Southwest Asia (10.4%): M* 0.7%, M3 2.1%, R2 2.8%, U7 4.8%
 Others (2.8%): N* 0.7%, R* 2.1%

1991–2003

The marshes had for some time been considered a refuge for elements persecuted by the government of Saddam Hussein, as in past centuries they had been a refuge for escaped slaves and serfs, such as during the Zanj Rebellion. By the mid-1980s, a low-level insurgency against Ba'athist drainage and resettlement projects had developed in the area, led by Sheik Abdul Kerim Mahud al-Muhammadawi of the Al bu Muhammad under the nom de guerre Abu Hatim.

During the 1970s, the expansion of irrigation projects had begun to disrupt the flow of water to the marshes. However, after the First Gulf War (1991), the Iraqi government aggressively revived a program to divert the flow of the Tigris River and the Euphrates River away from the marshes in retribution for a failed Shia uprising. This was done primarily to eliminate the food sources of the Marsh Arabs and to prevent any remaining militiamen from taking refuge in the marshes, the Badr Brigades and other militias having used them as cover. The plan, which was accompanied by a series of propaganda articles by the Iraqi regime directed against the Ma'dan, systematically converted the wetlands into a desert, forcing the residents out of their settlements in the region. Villages in the marshes were attacked and burnt down and there were reports of the water being deliberately poisoned.

The majority of the Maʻdān were displaced either to areas adjacent to the drained marshes, abandoning their traditional lifestyle in favour of conventional agriculture, to towns and camps in other areas of Iraq or to Iranian refugee camps. Only 1,600 of them were estimated to still be living on traditional dibins by 2003. The western Hammar Marshes and the Qurnah or Central Marshes had become completely desiccated, while the eastern Hawizeh Marshes had dramatically shrunk. The Marsh Arabs, who numbered about half a million in the 1950s, have dwindled to as few as 20,000 in Iraq, according to the United Nations. As of 2003, an estimated 80,000 to 120,000 have fled to refugee camps in Iran. However, following the Multi-National Force overthrow of the Saddam Hussein regime, water flow to the marshes was restored and the ecosystem has begun to recover, and many have returned to their native lands.

Observer Middle East correspondent Shyam Bhatia who spent two weeks with the Marsh Arabs in 1993 wrote the first eyewitness account of  Iraqi army tactics at the time of draining the marshes, bombing Marsh villages and then sowing mines in the water before retreating. Bhatia's extensive reportage won him the title of International Reporter of the Year, although exclusive film footage of the time he spent in the area has never been projected.

Since 2003
With the breaching of dikes by local communities subsequent to the 2003 invasion of Iraq and the ending of a four-year drought that same year, the process has been reversed and the marshes have experienced a substantial rate of recovery. The permanent wetlands now cover more than 50% of 1970s levels, with a remarkable regrowth of the Hammar and Hawizeh Marshes and some recovery of the Central Marshes.
Efforts to restore the marshes have led to signs of their gradual revivification as water is restored to the former desert, but the whole ecosystem may take far longer to restore than it took to destroy. Only a few thousand of the nearly half million Marsh Arabs remain in the area in Maysan Governorate, Dhi Qar Governorate and Basra Governorate. Most of the rest that can be accounted for are refugees living in other Shi'i areas in Iraq, or have emigrated to Iran, and many do not wish to return to their former home and lifestyle, which despite its independence was characterised by extreme poverty and hardship. A report by the United States Agency for International Development noted that while some Maʻdān had chosen to return to their traditional activities in the marshes, especially the Hammar Marshes, within a short time of reflooding, they were without clean drinking water, sanitation, health care or education facilities. In addition, it is still uncertain if the marshes will completely recover, given increased levels of water extraction from the Tigris and Euphrates.

Many of the resettled Marsh Arabs have gained representation through the Hezbollah Movement in Iraq; others have become followers of Muqtada al-Sadr's movement, through which they gained political control of Maysan Governorate. Political instability and local feuds, aggravated by the poverty of the dispossessed Marsh Arab population, remain a serious problem. Rory Stewart observed that throughout history, the Maʻdān were the pawn of many rulers and became expert dissimulators. The tribal chiefs are outwardly submissive and work with the coalition and Iraqi officials. Behind the scenes, the tribes engage in smuggling and other activities.

Literature
Pietro Della Valle (1586–1652) is cited in Gavin Young's Return to the Marshes as the earliest modern traveler to write about Mesopotamia and probably the first to introduce the word Madi, which he spelled "Maedi," to the Western world.

Young also mentions George Keppel, 6th Earl of Albemarle (1799–1891) as having spent time with the Madan in 1824 and reported in detail on the marsh inhabitants. Of the men Keppel wrote, "The Arab boatmen were as hardy and muscular-looking fellows as ever I saw. One loose brown shirt, of the coarseness of sack-cloth, was the only covering of the latter. This, when labour required it, was thrown aside, and discovered forms most admirably adapted to their laborious avocations; indeed, any of the boatmen would have made an excellent model for an Hercules; and one in particular, with uncombed hair and shaggy beard, struck us all with the resemblance he bore to statues of that deity." Of the women Keppel observed, "They came to our boat with the frankness of innocence and there was a freedom in their manners, bordering perhaps on the masculine; nevertheless their fine features and well-turned limbs produced a tout ensemble of beauty, not to be surpassed perhaps in the brilliant assemblies of civilized life."

Another account of the Maʻdān in English was jointly published in 1927 by a British colonial administrator, Stuart Edwin Hedgecock, and his wife. Gertrude Bell also visited the area. T. E. Lawrence had passed through in 1916, stopping at Basra and Ezra's Tomb (Al-Azair), and recorded that the Marsh Arabs were "wonderfully hard [...] but merry, and full of talk. They are in the water all their lives, and seem hardly to notice it."

The way of life of the Marsh Arabs was later described by the explorer Wilfred Thesiger in his classic The Marsh Arabs (1964). Thesiger lived with the Marsh Arabs for months at a time over a seven-year period (1951–1958), building excellent relationships with virtually all he met, and recording the details of day-to-day life in various regions of the marshes. Many of the areas that he visited have since been drained. Gavin Maxwell, the Scottish naturalist, travelled with Thesiger through the marshes in 1956 and published an account of their travels in his 1957 book A Reed Shaken by the Wind (later republished under the title People of the Reeds). The journalist and travel writer Gavin Young followed in Thesiger's footsteps, writing Return to the Marshes: Life with the Marsh Arabs of Iraq (1977; reissued 2009).

The first extensive scholarly ethnographic account of Marsh Arab life was Marsh Dwellers of the Euphrates Delta (1962), by Iraqi anthropologist S. M. Salim. An ethnoarchaeological study of the material culture of the Marsh Arabs has been published by Edward L. Ochsenschlager: Iraq's Marsh Arabs in the Garden of Eden (University of Pennsylvania Museum of Archaeology and Anthropology, 2004).

Rory Stewart described the Marsh Arabs and his experiences as deputy governor in the Maysan province (2003–2004) in his 2006 book, The Prince of the Marshes (also published under the title Occupational Hazards).

In 2011, Sam Kubba published The Iraqi Marshlands and the Marsh Arabs: The Ma'dan, Their Culture and the Environment. The Iraqi Marshlands and the Marsh Arabs details the rich cultural legacy and lifestyle that survives today only as a fragmented cultural inheritance.

In German, there are Sigrid Westphal-Hellbusch und Heinz Westphal, Die Ma'dan: Kultur und Geschichte der Marschenbewohner im Süd-Iraq (Berlin: Duncker und Humblot, 1962). Sigrid Westphal Hellbusch and her husband Heinz Westphal wrote a comprehensive study on the Madan based on research and observation obtained while living with Madan tribes. These observations outline how the Madan diverge from other Shia communities.

Films
Films about Marsh Arabs:
 Dawn of the World (L'Aube du monde), directed by Abbas Fahdel, 2008
 Iran, southwestern, directed by Mohammad Reza Fartousi, 2010
 Silent Companion (Hamsafare Khamoosh), directed by Elham Hosseinzadeh, 2004
 Zaman, The Man From The Reeds (Zaman, l'homme des roseaux), directed by Amer Alwan, 2003
 The Marshes (Al-Ahwar), directed by Kassem Hawal, 1975

See also

 Tigris–Euphrates river system
 Sumerians
 Shatt al-Arab
 Edward Bawden
 Mandaeans
 Mudhif
 Al-Duraji, a tribal confederation of southern Iraq, with a large presence in the Marsh Arabs
 Al-Muntafiq, a tribal confederation of southern Iraq, with a large presence in the Marsh Arabs

References

External links
 Images from Iraq's Marsh Arabs in the Garden of Eden, University of Pennsylvania
 Wilfred Thesiger's photographs of Marsh Arab life, Pitt Rivers Museum
 An article on the ancient and recent history of the Marsh Arabs at Laputan Logic (Part II)
 Life on the Edge of the Marshes: A twenty-year-long ethnographic study conducted by Edward Ochsenschlager. As well as documenting the traditional way of life of the Marsh Arabs, it also made comparisons with ancient Sumerian cultural practices.
 AMAR International Charitable Foundation ("Assisting Marsh Arabs and Refugees")
 Images of Iraq's Marsh Arabs Endangered Culture & Nature by Sate Al Abbasi 
 Dennis Dimick, Photos from 1967 reveal a lost culture in Iraq, published by National Geographic. Accessed 29 September 2015.
 ABC Australia, The Marsh Arabs of Iraq, short documentary (19 mins) outlining attempts to resettle the marshlands 
 or https://www.dw.com/en/reviving-the-marshlands-in-southern-iraq/a-18301544 Thomas Aders, Reviving the Marshlands, [short report, Deutsche Welle, 17 March, 2015] 

 
Ethnic groups in Iraq
Ethnic groups in the Middle East
Demographics of Iraq
Ethnic groups in the Arab world
Ethnic groups in Iran
Mesopotamian Marshes